Middle Sister Island is a  island in Lake Erie.  Along with West Sister Island (in Ohio, USA) and East Sister Island, it is part of the Pelee Archipelago in the western basin of Lake Erie, and is considered to be the "most natural and undisturbed" of these islands.

The island was previously listed for sale with an asking price of CA$888,888 in 2017.

War of 1812
The island was a staging area for William Henry Harrison's U.S. troops, just prior to the invasion of Canada and the Battle of the Thames.

Flora and fauna
Guano from the Lake Erie population of double-crested cormorants is interfering with tree growth in the Carolinian forest on this island and the nearby East Sister Island and Middle Island.

References

Landforms of Essex County, Ontario
War of 1812
Islands of Lake Erie in Ontario